Sport in Afghanistan is managed by the Afghan Sports Federation. Cricket and association football are the two most popular sports in Afghanistan. The traditional and the national sport of Afghanistan is Buzkashi. The Afghan Sports Federation promotes cricket, association football, basketball, volleyball, golf, handball, boxing, taekwondo, weightlifting, bodybuilding, track and field, skating, bowling, snooker, chess, and other sports in the country.

The Afghanistan national cricket team's win over Namibia in Krugersdorp earned them official One Day International status in April 2009. The Afghanistan Cricket Board is Afghanistan's representative at the International Cricket Council and was an associate member of ICC from June 2013 to 2017. It is also a member of the Asian Cricket Council. Afghanistan became a full member of the International Cricket Council on 22 June 2017, entitling the national team to participate in official Test matches.

Cricket

Cricket is the most popular sport in Afghanistan and is one of the main sports that Afghans participate in and watch on television.
In the national level, cricket matches are played between provinces, mainly between the south and eastern provinces of the country.  According to locals, cricket has helped Afghanistan in bringing unity.

Cricket was introduced to Afghan refugees by Pakistanis and the Afghanistan national cricket team was formed in 2001 following the fall of the Taliban and was set up mainly by Afghans returning from Pakistan, led by Taj Malik Alam, with some help from the British Embassy; from starting with a match against the British Army in 2002 it has gone on to  hold matches against all major international cricket teams. The Afghans rapidly rose through the World Cricket League since early 2008. It participated in the 2009 ICC World Cup Qualifier, and qualified for the first time for the 2010 ICC World Twenty20 in the 2010 ICC World Cricket League Division One. The Afghanistan national women's cricket team was formed in 2010. Afghanistan national cricket team have competed in the ICC World Twenty20 since their qualification in 2010 and their debut for the Cricket World Cup since 2015.

Afghanistan Cricket Board (ACB) is the official governing body of the sport of cricket in Afghanistan. Its current headquarters is in Kabul, Afghanistan. The Afghanistan Cricket Board is Afghanistan's representative at the International Cricket Council and was an associate member of ICC from June 2013 to 2017. Now it is one of the full members of ICC since 2017. It is also a member of the Asian Cricket Council.

Afghanistan's playing season runs from May to September. There are 320 cricket clubs and 6 turf wickets in Afghanistan. In February 2017 the International Cricket Council (ICC) awarded first-class status to Afghanistan's four-day domestic competition. They also granted List A status to their existing Twenty20 domestic competition, as Afghanistan did not have a domestic 50-over tournament. In May 2017 however, the ICC recognised the 50-over Ghazi Amanullah Khan Regional One Day Tournament by granting it List A status.

Starting from 2017 season, Afghanistan has a four-day first-class competition (Ahmad Shah Abdali 4-day Tournament), a 50-over List A competition (Ghazi Amanullah Khan Regional One Day Tournament) and a recognized Twenty20 league (Shpageeza Cricket League).

Today, cricket is the most popular sport in Afghanistan, and the Afghanistan team has made quick progress in the international arena through winning a number of international competitions.

Winners of the ACC Twenty20 Cup the most number of times (2007, 2009, 2011 and 2013).
Cricket World Cup Appearances: 2 (2015, 2019)

Football

The Afghanistan national football team was formed in 1922, joining FIFA in 1948 and the Asian Football Confederation (AFC) in 1954. Afghanistan's only appearance and first FIFA international match was at the Olympic Games football tournament in the 1948 Summer Olympic Games when they played Luxembourg on 26 July 1948 and lost 6–0. Although it did not play in any international games from 1984 to 2003 due to internal conflicts, it is striving and hoping to make it to FIFA one day. The national stadium, which was built during the reign of King Amanullah Khan, has been used for football matches between teams from different provinces of the country as well as neighboring countries. In the national level, football matches are played between provinces or regions. The Afghanistan women's national football team was formed in 2007. During the 2011 SAFF Championship, the Afghan team marked its first win over Nepal.

Winner of the 2013 FIFA Fair Play Award
Champions of the 2013 SAFF Championship
Runners-up of the 2011 & 2015 SAFF Championship
Runners-up of the 2010 South Asian Games

Buzkashi

Buzkashi is the traditional and national sport and a "passion" in Afghanistan where it is often played on Fridays and special events, matches draw thousands of fans. Whitney Azoy notes in his book Buzkashi: Game and Power in Afghanistan that "leaders are men who can seize control by means foul and fair and then fight off their rivals. The Buzkashi rider does the same". Traditionally, games could last for several days, but in its more regulated tournament version, it has a limited match time.

Basketball

Basketball was first played in Afghanistan in 1936. In 1966, the Afghanistan National Olympic Committee (ANOC) founded the Afghanistan national basketball team after receiving challenges from India and Pakistan. Tom Gouttierre, an American Peace Corps and coach of the team at Habibia High School, became the first coach. It is played by both Afghan men and women.

Champions: 2010 South Asian Games
Champions: 2012 Asian Beach Games

Mixed Martial Arts

Afghans have taken a recent interest in mixed martial arts. There are several gyms in Afghanistan which promote the sport and have fighters. Siyar Bahadurzada is a mixed martial artist who competes in the Ultimate Fighting Championship. He is well known for holding and wearing the Afghan flag around himself before and after his professional fights.

Taekwondo

Rohullah Nikpai was the first Afghan representative of his nation to win a medal for Afghanistan in the Olympics. He won Bronze in the 2008 and 2012 Olympics, the only two occasions Afghanistan have received medals. This sport has recently thrived in Afghanistan by his influence.

Nikpai's medal tally summary in the Olympics:
Bronze in 2008 Olympics
Bronze in 2012 Olympics

Boxing

Boxing has recently flourished in Afghanistan, with Hamid Rahimi having a huge influence in the country.
The first ever boxing match in Afghanistan was held in 2012 with Rahimi fighting and winning by TKO (Technical Knockout).

Bodybuilding
Bodybuilding is widely enjoyed in Afghanistan. An Afghan by the name of Ahmad Yasin Salik Qaderi ("Mr. Muscles") became the overall winner of the 2017 World Championship in Bodybuilding and Fitness, which was held in Ulaanbaatar, Mongolia.

Other sports
Other sports in which Afghanistan competes include volleyball, golf, track and field, team handball, rugby, weightlifting, ice skating, bowling, baseball, snooker, and chess. Saleh Mohammad is a professional Afghan snooker player, who previously represented Pakistan in international competitions but is now representing Afghanistan.

Buzkashi is a traditional sport and it is mostly played by people in northern Afghanistan and in Central Asia, as well as in northwestern parts of neighboring Pakistan.

The Afghanistan Rugby Federation (ARF) was formed in 2011, and is registered with the National Olympic Committee and approved by the Government of the Islamic Republic of Afghanistan. The national team participated in the 2018 Asian Games in Indonesia and took part in the Olympic qualifiers in South Korea in 2019.

Afghanistan also became a member of the Federation of International Bandy in 2012.

In 2015 Afghanistan held its first marathon; among those who ran the entire marathon was one woman, Zainab, age 25, who thus became the first Afghan woman to run in a marathon within her own country.

Stadiums and gymnasiums

There are small sized football stadiums in most major cities of Afghanistan, which were built before the 1970s and they lack modern seatings. They will only improve once more if people turn to sport and the nation's economy picks up, including the security situation and proper investors are found. The President of the Afghanistan Cricket Board, Omar Zakhilwal, announced in October 2010 that the government was planning to construct standard cricket grounds in all 34 provinces in the next two years. There is also another larger gymnasium under construction in Kabul. Currently, there is only the Olympic Committee Gymnasium, which is constantly used by teams of different sports.

The following are some of the major stadiums in Afghanistan:
 Sherzai Cricket Stadium in Jalalabad
 Kandahar International Cricket Stadium in Kandahar
 Kandahar Stadium
 Kabul National Cricket Stadium in Kabul
 Ghazi Stadium in Kabul

By capacity:

References

External links